The 2014–15 Drexel Dragons men's basketball team represented Drexel University during the 2014–15 NCAA Division I men's basketball season. The Dragons, led by 14th year head coach Bruiser Flint, played their home games at the Daskalakis Athletic Center and were members of the Colonial Athletic Association.

They finished the season 11–19, 9–9 in CAA play to finish in a tie for sixth place. They lost in the first round of the CAA tournament to the College of Charleston.

Previous season

The 2013–14 Drexel Dragons finished the season with a record of 18-16 after losing to Northeastern in the 2014 CAA men's basketball tournament. The team went 8–8 in the CAA regular season, and was the 4 seed in the conference tournament.

Off season

Departures

Incoming transfers

 Ahmad Fields is not eligible to play in the 2014–15 season due to NCAA transfer rules.  Fields will redshirt and enter the 2015–16 season as a redshirt sophomore with 3 years of eligibility remaining.

2014 Recruiting Class

Roster

On April 15, 2014, Drexel announced that senior forward Kazembe Abif would miss the entire 2014–15 season due to a right ACL injury.  Abif also missed a large part of the previous season due to a variety of injuries, including a fractured hand.  Abif redshirted the season and retained one year of eligibility entering the 2015–16 season.
On October 31, 2014, Drexel announced that sophomore point guard Major Canady would miss the 2014–15 season due to a right ankle injury.  Canady redshirted the season and retained 3 years of eligibility remaining entering the 2015–16 season.
On November 19, 2014, Drexel announced that freshman forward Austin Williams was expected to miss "approximately 6-8 weeks due to a left foot injury."  He recorded 6 rebounds in the team's season opener against Colorado and sat out the following game before the injury was announced.  Williams returned earlier than expected on January 3, 2015.
On December 28, 2014, it was reported that redshirt senior Sooren Derboghosian suffered a major knee injury that would require surgery, and would miss the remainder of the season.
On December 29, 2014, forward Rodney Williams tweeted that he suffered a stress fracture in his foot, and would miss the next 4–6 weeks.  He returned on January 28, 2015 against Northeastern.
On February 22, 2015, the school announced that redshirt junior Damion Lee suffered a fractured right hand the previous day in a game against Northeastern, and would miss the rest of the season.
On February 26, 2015, the school announced that freshman guard Sammy Mojica suffered a sprained MCL in practice earlier in the week, and would miss the remainder of the season.

Depth chart

Schedule

|-
!colspan=12 style=| Exhibition
|-

|-
!colspan=12 style=| Non-Conference Regular Season
|-

|-
!colspan=12 style=| CAA Regular Season

|-
!colspan=12 style=| CAA Tournament

Team statistics

As of the end of the season. 
 Indicates team leader in each category. 
(FG%, FT% leader = minimum 50 att.; 3P% leader = minimum 20 att.)

Awards
Damion Lee
Team Most Valuable Player
First Team NABC All-District Team
CAA All-Conference First Team
CAA All-Defensive Team
CAA All-Academic Team
CAA Player of the Week (2)
Charleston Classic All-Tournament Team
Preseason CAA All-Conference First Team

Tavon Allen
Assist Award (team leader in assists)
Dragon "D" Award (team's top defensive player)
Preseason CAA All-Conference Team Honorable Mention

Rodney Williams
"Sweep" Award (team leader in blocks)
CAA All-Academic Team
Team Academic Award
Donald Shank Spirit & Dedication Award

Sammy Mojica
Samuel D. Cozen Award (most improved player)
CAA Rookie of the Week

Tyshawn Myles
CAA Rookie of the Week

See also
2014–15 Drexel Dragons women's basketball team

References

Drexel Dragons men's basketball seasons
Drexel
Drexel
Drexel